The 1908 All-Western college football team consists of American football players selected to the All-Western teams chosen by various selectors for the 1908 college football season.

All-Western selections

Ends
 James Dean, Wisconsin (ALF, CDN, WE)
 Walter Henry Rademacher, Minnesota (CDN, CRH)
 Harlan Page, Chicago (ALF, WE)
 Anderson, Wisconsin (CRH)

Tackles
 James Walker, Minnesota (ALF, CDN, CRH, WE)
 Oscar Osthoff, Wisconsin (ALF, CDN)
 Ralph Dimmick, Notre Dame (WE)

Guards
 Albert Benbrook, Michigan (CDN, CRH, WE) (CFHOF)
 Glenn D. Butzer, Illinois (ALF, CDN, CRH)
 Sam Dolan, Notre Dame (WE)
 William Mackmiller, Wisconsin (ALF)

Centers
 Henry E. Farnum, Minnesota (CDN, CRH)
 Andrew W. Smith, Michigan (WE)
 Benjamin Harrison Badenoch, Chicago (ALF)

Quarterbacks
 John McGovern, Minnesota (ALF, CRH, WE) (CFHOF)
 Harlan Page, Chicago (CDN)

Halfbacks
 Dave Allerdice, Michigan (CDN, WE)
 Joe Magidsohn, Michigan (CRH, WE)
 William Lucas Crawley, Chicago (ALF, CRH)
 Reuben Martin Rosenwald, Minnesota (ALF, CDN)

Fullbacks 
 Earle T. Pickering, Minnesota (ALF, CRH)
 Oscar William Worthwine, Chicago (CDN)
 Robert E. Vaughan, Notre Dame (WE)

Key
Bold = consensus choice by a majority of the selectors

ALF = A. L. Fridstein in Daily Maroon (Univ. of Chicago)

CDN = Chicago Daily News

CRH = Chicago Record-Herald

WE = Walter Eckersall in the Chicago Tribune

CFHOF = College Football Hall of Fame

See also
1908 College Football All-America Team

References

All-Western team
All-Western college football teams